In cryptography, message forgery is sending a message so to deceive the recipient about the actual sender's identity. A common example is sending a spam or prank e-mail as if it were originated from an address other than the one which was really used.

See also
 Authentication
 Message authentication code
 Stream cipher attack

Cryptographic attacks
Practical jokes